Gheorghe Albu (12 September 1909 in Arad, Austria-Hungary, (now in Romania) – 26 June 1974 in Făgăraș, Brașov County, Romania) was a Romanian football player and manager. He was a part of Romania national football team which played at the 1934 FIFA World Cup.

Player career

Club career

Albu started his career in 1924, playing as a youth for AMEF Arad until 1928. In 1929, he moved to another Arad-based team, Gloria CFR, and played the final of the Romanian Championship 1929–30, against Juventus București. Gloria CFR Arad lost the final, 0–3.

In 1933, he moved to Venus București and in his first season for The Blacks he was crowned Champion of Romania. Until 1940, when he left Venus, he won four championship titles. Between 1940 and 1944, the year of his retirement from professional football, Albu played for FC Craiova.

International career
Gheorghe Albu made his first appearance for the Romania national football team in May 1931, in a match against Bulgaria, won by the Romanians, 5–2.

After that, he made 39 consecutive appearances in the starting lineup for Romania, including the 1934 FIFA World Cup match against Czechoslovakia, lost by The Tricolours, 1–2.

After a short break, he was called up again to the national team for another three consecutive matches. He was the captain of the national side of Romania nineteen times. He played his last match in December 1938, against Czechoslovakia. In this match, Gheorghe Albu's opponent, the legendary Josef Bican, scored four goals, as Romania lost by 2 goals to 6.

Managerial career
After World War II, Gheorghe Albu trained a number of teams, including FC Craiova, Textila Sfântu Gheorghe, Foresta Fălticeni, Dermata Cluj or UT Arad, and was also, for a short time, the manager of the national team. In 1959, he returned to Arad, acting as manager of AMEF Arad until 1962 and Vagonul Arad between 1962 and 1964. From 1964 until his death, he worked at Făgăraș, where he trained the youth teams of Nitramonia Făgăraș.

Honours

Player
Venus București
Liga I (4): 1933–34, 1938–39, 1939–40, 1948–49

References

External links

1909 births
1974 deaths
Sportspeople from Arad, Romania
1934 FIFA World Cup players
Romanian footballers
Romania international footballers
Liga I players
Vagonul Arad players
CS Gloria Arad players
Venus București players
Romanian football managers
FC UTA Arad managers
Association football defenders
Romania national football team managers